The following is a list of television performers who died during production of the television show in which they were appearing. In many cases, a show will handle the death of an actor by killing off their character or otherwise writing them out of the show. In other cases, the show may recast the part with another actor. In extreme cases, the show may be cancelled outright.

List

See also
List of entertainers who died during a performance
List of television programs in which one character was played by multiple actors
List of works published posthumously

References

External links
10 Actors who Died During TV Shows

Death-related lists
Lists of television actors